Canoe Mountain is a  mountain summit in British Columbia, Canada.

Description
The Southern Yellowhead Highway traverses the western base of the mountain. Precipitation runoff from Canoe Mountain drains west into Camp Creek which is tributary of the Canoe River, as well as east into Kinbasket Lake. The steep north aspect of the mountain holds a cirque, whereas an unpaved fire service road climbs the modest west slope to a telecommunications tower at the top. The mountain's long-established local name was officially adopted 16 November 1976 by the Geographical Names Board of Canada.

Climate
Based on the Köppen climate classification, Canoe Mountain is located in a subarctic climate zone with cold, snowy winters, and mild summers. Temperatures in winter can drop below −20°C with wind chill factors below −30°C.

See also
 Geography of British Columbia

References

External links

 Canoe Mountain: weather forecast
 Canoe Mountain: dangerousroads.org
 Canoe Mountain: stevensong.com

Monashee Mountains
Two-thousanders of British Columbia
Cariboo Land District